Lady Oscar (Japanese: ベルサイユのばら Hepburn: Berusaiyu no bara, "The Rose of Versailles") is a 1979 English-language romantic period drama film, based on the manga The Rose of Versailles by Riyoko Ikeda. The film was written and directed by Jacques Demy, with music composed by his regular collaborator Michel Legrand. The British-French-Japanese co-production was produced by Mataichiro Yamamoto for Kitty Films, Nippon TV, Toho, and Ciné Tamaris, and was filmed on location in France.

Catriona MacColl stars as the eponymous Oscar François de Jarjayes, with Barry Stokes as her lover André Grandier, alongside Jonas Bergström, Christine Böhm, Mark Kingston, Georges Wilson, Sue Lloyd, Martin Potter, and Anouska Hempel. A young Lambert Wilson appears in a minor role.

Plot
Oscar François de Jarjayes is a young woman whose father, a career military man, wanted a boy. After she was born her father took to dressing Oscar in boy's clothes and raising her as a man. Though privately Oscar acknowledges her feminine side, she dresses as a man and gains an honored position as a guard of Marie Antoinette. In her youth, Oscar is in love with Andre, the son of the family's housekeeper. Years later, when the French Revolution begins, Oscar and Andre's paths cross for the first time in years. With the assault on the Bastille, Oscar and Andre find themselves fighting on opposite sides of the revolution.

Cast

Production
The major sponsor of the film was Shiseido, a cosmetics company, and Catriona McColl promoted a red lipstick for the spring cosmetic line that year. Frederik L. Schodt and Jared Cook translated the entire manga series into English as a reference for the producers of this film, but gave the only copy of the translation to them and it was lost.

The production was based at Auditel Studios in Paris, with filming locations including Jossigny, Senlis, and the Palace of Versailles.

Reception
The film was not a commercial success, and Catriona MacColl's portrayal of Oscar, in particular, was criticized. Conversely, Variety described the film as recalling early Hollywood epics, and praised  McColl's depiction of Oscar as a "woman waiting to burst out of a man's clothing".

Kevin Thomas, writing for the Los Angeles Times, described the film as a typical Jacques Demy film, noting its preoccupation with contrasting the lives of the aristocrats and the lives of the poor. Anne Duggan took a similar view when situating Lady Oscar within the context of Demy's other films.  Duggan describes Ikeda's Oscar as having "more self-knowledge" in some respects than the Oscar of the film, who therefore has arguably less agency, whereas "Demy goes further than Ikeda in challenging the tradition of the maiden warrior by questioning the implicit class prejudices underlying the order that upholds forms of aristocratic heroism".

References

Further reading

External links
 

1979 films
Live-action films based on manga
Films directed by Jacques Demy
French Revolution films
1979 romantic drama films
The Rose of Versailles
Cross-dressing in film
Films scored by Michel Legrand
Films about Marie Antoinette
English-language French films
English-language Japanese films
French historical romance films
1970s historical romance films
Cultural depictions of Louis XVI
Films set in 1755
Films set in 1785
Films set in 1789
Films set in France
Cultural depictions of Maximilien Robespierre
1970s English-language films
1970s French films